Daytime Wives is a 1923 American drama film directed by Émile Chautard, and written by Helmer Walton Bergman and Wyndham Gittens. The film stars Derelys Perdue, Wyndham Standing, Grace Darmond, William Conklin, Guy Edward Hearn, and Katherine Lewis. The film was released on September 2, 1923, by Film Booking Offices of America.

Cast      
Derelys Perdue as Ruth Holt 
Wyndham Standing as Elwood Adams
Grace Darmond as Francine Adams
William Conklin as Amos Martin
Guy Edward Hearn as Ben Branscom
Katherine Lewis as Betty Branscom
Kenneth Gibson as Larry Gilfeather
Christina Mott as Celeste
Jack Carlyle as Jack Jagner
Craig Biddle Jr. as A Laborer
Mickey McBan as Child (uncredited)

References

External links

Mike Mashon (January 2, 2019), "Welcoming Two “New” Films to the Public Domain", Library of Congress. Copy of partially restored Daytime Wives ("work in progress").

1923 films
1920s English-language films
Silent American drama films
1923 drama films
Film Booking Offices of America films
Films directed by Emile Chautard
American silent feature films
American black-and-white films
1920s American films